Alcide Côté,  (May 19, 1903 – August 7, 1955) was a Canadian politician and lawyer.

Born in Saint-Jean-sur-Richelieu, Quebec, he was a lawyer before being elected to the House of Commons of Canada for the riding of Saint-Jean—Iberville—Napierville in the 1945 federal election. A Liberal, he was re-elected in 1949 and 1953. From 1952 to 1955, he was the Postmaster General of Canada. He died while in office and had a state funeral.

References

1903 births
1955 deaths
People from Saint-Jean-sur-Richelieu
Liberal Party of Canada MPs
Members of the House of Commons of Canada from Quebec
Members of the King's Privy Council for Canada
French Quebecers